The 1969 World Wrestling Championships were held in Mar del Plata, Argentina.

Medal table

Team ranking

Medal summary

Men's freestyle

Men's Greco-Roman

References
FILA Database

World Wrestling Championships
W
Mar del Plata
1969 in sport wrestling
1969 in Argentine sport
March 1969 sports events in South America